Andrew Bulmer is an Australian former rugby league footballer who played for the North Queensland Cowboys in the 1990s. He primarily played .

Playing career
In Round 9 of the 1996 ARL season, he made his first grade debut in the Cowboys' 12–26 loss to the Parramatta Eels.

In 1997, he played for the Cairns Cyclones in the Queensland Cup.

References

Living people
Australian rugby league players
North Queensland Cowboys players
Rugby league players from Queensland
Rugby league second-rows
Year of birth missing (living people)